Kirwan is a suburb in the City of Townsville, Queensland, Australia.

Geography 
Kirwan is a primarily residential suburb but includes some commercial property, primarily concentrated along Thuringowa Drive.

History 
The suburb of Kirwan was established in 1968 as the northernmost of a series of new suburbs along the western side of the Upper Ross River. It was officially named on 1 March 1969 and took its name from an early farming family in the region. Prior to suburban development, Kirwan had been farmed and had also been the site of air force activity during World War II.

Kirwan State School opened in 1977 and Kirwan State High School opened in 1979. Ryan Catholic College, which serves both primary and secondary students, was also founded in 1979. The Willows State School was established in the suburb in 1997.

Population
According to the 2016 census of Population, there were  21,418 people in Kirwan.
 Aboriginal and Torres Strait Islander people made up 8.5% of the population. 
 82.4% of people were born in Australia. The next most common countries of birth were New Zealand 2.5%, England 2.4%, Philippines 1.0% and Papua New Guinea 0.6%.   
 88.2% of people spoke only English at home. Other languages spoken at home included Italian at 0.5%. 
 The most common responses for religion were  Catholic 29.7%, No Religion 25.6% and Anglican 16.2%.

Amenities 

Several leisure facilities are situated within Kirwan itself, including the Willows Golf Club, the Townsville and District Junior Rugby League Grounds and the Townsville Brothers Leagues Club. Kirwan is also well known as the home of the National Rugby League team, the North Queensland Cowboys, and is the site of 1300SMILES Stadium.

The Willows branch of the Queensland Country Women's Association meets at the Girl Guide Hut on the corner of McBride Street and Bamford Lane.

Nearby amenities 
At its southern end are the retail and entertainment precincts of Thuringowa Central, which include the Willows Shopping Centre and the Riverway complex, the latter of which lines the northern bank of the Ross River and includes parkland, swimming pools, barbecue facilities and an arts centre. It also plays home to night markets. Also situated near the southern border of Kirwan is the Cannon Park complex in Condon, which offers a range of restaurants, a cinema and other leisure providers, and formerly a military memorial in the form of a WWII era cannon, dedicated to the 18 servicemen lost when two Blackhawk helicopters collided on a night exercise in 1996, on the nearby Hervey Range.

Education 
Kirwan State School is a government primary (Prep-6) school for boys and girls at 21 Burnda Street. In 2017, the school had an enrolment of 900 students with 60 teachers (55 full-time equivalent) and 29 non-teaching staff (20 full-time equivalent). It includes a special education program.

The Willows State School is a government primary (Prep-6) school for boys and girls at Bilberry Street. In 2017, the school had an enrolment of 1,007 students with 75 teachers (68 full-time equivalent) and 32 non-teaching staff (23 full-time equivalent). It includes a special education program.

Kirwan State High School is a government secondary (7-12) school for boys and girls at Hudson Street. In 2017, the school had an enrolment of 1,997 students with 157 teachers (147 full-time equivalent) and 75 non-teaching staff (59 full-time equivalent). It includes a special education program.

Ryan Catholic College is a Catholic primary and secondary (Prep-12) school for boys and girls at 59 Canterbury Road. In 2017, the school had an enrolment of 1,886 students with 143 teachers (131 full-time equivalent) and 84 non-teaching staff (69 full-time equivalent).

References

External links

 

Suburbs of Townsville